Okeover Arm Provincial Park is a provincial park in British Columbia, Canada, located on the west side of Okeover Inlet facing Desolation Sound, on the east side of the Malaspina Peninsula.

References

Sunshine Coast (British Columbia)
Provincial parks of British Columbia
2000 establishments in British Columbia
Protected areas established in 2000